In algebraic geometry, given a reductive algebraic group G and a Borel subgroup B, a spherical variety is a G-variety with an open dense B-orbit. It is sometimes also assumed to be normal. Examples are flag varieties, symmetric spaces and (affine or projective) toric varieties.

There is also a notion of real spherical varieties.

A projective spherical variety is a Mori dream space.

Spherical embeddings are classified by so-called colored fans, a generalization of fans for toric varieties; this is known as Luna-Vust Theory.

In his seminal paper,  developed a framework to classify complex spherical subgroups of reductive groups; he reduced the classification of spherical subgroups to wonderful subgroups. He further worked out the case of groups of type A and conjectured that combinatorial objects consisting of "homogeneous spherical data" classify spherical subgroups. This is known as the Luna Conjecture.
This classification is now complete according to Luna's program; see contributions of Bravi, Cupit-Foutou, Losev and Pezzini.

As conjectured by Knop, every "smooth" affine spherical variety is uniquely determined by its weight monoid. 
This uniqueness result was proven by Losev.

 has been developing a program to classify spherical varieties in arbitrary characteristic.

References 

Paolo Bravi, Wonderful varieties of type E, Representation theory 11 (2007), 174–191.
Paolo Bravi and Stéphanie Cupit-Foutou, Classification of strict wonderful varieties, Annales de l'Institut Fourier (2010), Volume 60, Issue 2, 641–681.
Paolo Bravi and Guido Pezzini, Wonderful varieties of type D, Representation theory 9 (2005), pp. 578–637.
Paolo Bravi and Guido Pezzini, Wonderful subgroups of reductive groups and spherical systems, J. Algebra 409 (2014), 101–147. 
Paolo Bravi and Guido Pezzini, The spherical systems of the wonderful reductive subgroups, J. Lie Theory 25 (2015), 105–123.
Paolo Bravi and Guido Pezzini, Primitive wonderful varieties, Arxiv 1106.3187.
Stéphanie Cupit-Foutou, Wonderful Varieties. a geometrical realization, Arxiv 0907.2852.
Michel Brion, "Introduction to actions of algebraic groups" 

Algebraic geometry